Christian Söderström (born October 13, 1980) is a Swedish professional ice hockey forward who currently plays with IF Sundsvall in the Swedish HockeyAllsvenskan.

He was drafted by the Detroit Red Wings in the 2002 NHL Entry Draft in 9th round as the 262nd pick overall. After playing for his home town club Timrå IK since he started playing hockey as a young boy, Söderström transferred himself to league rivals Färjestads BK in January 2006. And it was a lucky move for Söderstörm, because Timrå did not make it to the playoffs and that did Färjestad and they did also won the playoffs and the Swedish Championship in April 2006. After the playoffs he signed a new two-year-contract with Färjestad.

Söderström has played some for the Swedish national team, but never in a major tournament.

Career statistics

External links

1980 births
Living people
Ässät players
Detroit Red Wings draft picks
Lørenskog IK players
Färjestad BK players
Skellefteå AIK players
IF Sundsvall Hockey players
Swedish ice hockey left wingers
Timrå IK players
People from Sundsvall
Sportspeople from Västernorrland County